Alhaji Ibrahim Talba OON (born January 11, 1949) is a Nigerian Karai-Karai politician and retired civil servant who served as the Secretary to the Government of the Federation. He was a three-time Gubernatorial Aspirant in Yobe State during the 2007, 2015 and 2019 general elections under the Peoples Democratic Party (PDP) before he decamped to All Progressive Congress (APC)

Family Background
Talba was born in the town of Nangere to a royal family of the Pakarau branch of the Karai-Karai. He is an elder brother to HRH Alhaji Muhammadu Abubakar Ibn Grema, the Emir of Tikau. He currently holds the traditional title of Ciroman Tikau.

Education
Talba attended Nangere Primary School from 1957- 1960 where  he did his primary school and went to  Potiskum Senior Primary School from 1961 to 1963 then to Government College, Keffi, from 1964 to 1968 again to Government Secondary School Bauchi, from 1969 to 1970 for his secondary school education. He went to Ahmadu Bello University, Zaria, from 1971 to 1974 where he obtained his first degree. he also study at University of Wisconsin, Madison, Wisconsin, USA from 1978 to 1979 and Harvard University, Cambridge, USA in 1986.

Career
Talba started his career as a Teacher at Oyemekun Grammar School in Ondo State from the year 1974–1975. Later he became the Assistant Secretary 1 of the North-East State Ministry of Finance, Maiduguri; then Secretary North-East/Borno State Tenders Board in 1976; from there he moved to the position of Divisional Officer, Gwoza Division where he worked from 1976 to 1977; he became Under-sec. Ministry of Finance, Maiduguri in 1976–1979; then to Acting Secretary in 1979–1980. From the year 1980-1981 Talba became the Area Liaison Officer, UTC Nigeria Ltd. Then to Principal Marketing Officer, Nigeria National Supply Company Ltd in 1981–1984. He also worked as the Administrative Manager, Head of Administration, Nigeria National Supply Company in 1984–1986. He served as General Manager at Nigeria National Supply Company from 1986 to 1987; Secretary Public Agencies and International Affairs, and also Cabinet Office in 1988–89.

The Presidency
Talba worked at various offices in the Nigeria Presidency, he was the Ag. Director International Affairs Department from 1989 to 1992; Director, International Organisations from 1992 to 1996; Director. Ministry of Communications, Abuja, since 1996. He also served as mm. National Committee Against Apartheid from 1988 to 1992 and Head, Documentation Unit, Office of the OAU.

Deligations
He was nominated in Lagos, 1992; Under, Nigerian Delegation to Republic of Gabon to negotiate the evacuation of illegal Nigerian residents, 1992. He was a member Nigerian Delegation to the Commonwealth Heads of Government Meeting, Auckland, New Zealand in 1995; and serve as observer, African Development Bank Annual General Meeting in Abuja in the year 1995. He became member of the Nigerian Delegation to the OAU Summit in Yaounde, Cameroon in 1996.

Foundation
Talba is a member of Nigerian Conservation Foundation, Council of Nigerian Farmers

Publications
 Abuja Summit: A Commemorative Handbook, OAU 1991

Memberships
Talba is a member of the IBB International Gulf Club and Nigeria Golf Federation.

Politics
Talba contested as a Gubernatorial candidate in Yobe State under the Peoples Democratic Party in 2007 general election, 2011 and 2015. On December 3, 2017, talba decamped from PDP returning his party membership card.

References

Nigerian government officials
Officers of the Order of the Niger
People from Yobe State
1949 births
Living people
Nigerian politicians
Nigerian Karai-Karai people